Sawagada is a village development committee in Rautahat District in the Narayani Zone of south-eastern Nepal.

References

Populated places in Rautahat District